The Palm Beach Band Boys was a studio recording group ostensibly assembled by RCA Victor to capitalize on the success of The New Vaudeville Band's hit single, "Winchester Cathedral". They performed in a style for which the New Vaudeville Band's promoters coined the term, newstalgia, a kind of faux 1920s/1930s sound, featuring nasal vocals, banjo, brass, electric guitar, rock drums, and bassoon. (Mort Goode uses the term in his liner notes for their first album.) According to a December 1966 TIME article, the vocalist is actually "an RCA executive who croons while holding his nose."

Their album Winchester Cathedral peaked at #149 on the Billboard 200. Their song "I'm Gonna Sit Right Down and Write Myself a Letter" peaked at #25 on the Adult Contemporary chart.

Discography

Winchester Cathedral
Their first LP (Mono LPM-3734/Stereo LSP-3734), Winchester Cathedral, recorded in RCA Victor's Studios A and B in New York City was released in 1966. It featured arrangements by Billy Mure and was produced by Danny Davis.

A side
 Winchester Cathedral
 A Little Bit Independent
 Boo-Hoo
 Let a Smile Be Your Umbrella
 I'm Gonna Sit Right Down and Write Myself a Letter

B side
 Bend It
 It Looks Like Rain in Cherry Blossom Lane
 I Don't Want to Set the World on Fire
 Ida, Sweet As Apple Cider
 Gypsy Caravan

The Palm Beach Band Boys Strike Again
A subsequent album (LSP-3808) was released in 1967, The Palm Beach Band Boys Strike Again.

Songs
 The Object of My Affection
 Josephine
 Me and My Shadow
 At Sundown
 You Tell Me Your Dream
 Wildflower
 Strangers in the Night
 Mean To Me
 I Don't Know Why
 I'll Get By
 Suzette

References

American musical groups
Musical groups with year of establishment missing
Musical groups with year of disestablishment missing
Musical groups from the United States with local place of origin missing